Dennis William Harding,  (born 1940), known as D. W. Harding, is a British archaeologist and academic, specialising in the British Iron Age. Having taught at the University of Durham from 1966 to 1977, he was then Abercromby Professor of Archaeology at the University of Edinburgh from 1977 to 2007.

Biography
Harding was born on 11 April 1940. He studied English Language and Literature at Keble College, Oxford, graduating with a Bachelor of Arts (BA) degree in 1963. Amongst his tutors were John Carey and Malcolm Parkes. He then took a Doctor of Philosophy (DPhil) degree in archaeology: his supervisor in the Institute of Archaeology was Christopher Hawkes. He spent the 1965/66 academic year as an assistant keeper in the Department of Antiquities of the Ashmolean Museum. He completed his DPhil in 1969 with a doctoral thesis titled "The Iron Age of the Upper Thames basin and its further relations to other regions of southern Britain".

Harding joined Durham University as a lecturer in Celtic archaeology in 1966. He was promoted to senior lecturer in 1975. In 1977, he was appointed Abercromby Professor of Archaeology at the University of Edinburgh, succeeding Stuart Piggott. Under his leadership, the archaeology department maintained its strengths in prehistoric Europe and Near Eastern archaeology. In addition to his chair, he was dean of the Faculty of Arts from 1983 to 1986, and vice-principal of the University of Edinburgh from 1988 to 1991. He retired in 2007, and was made emeritus professor.

Selected works

References

1940 births
Living people
British archaeologists
Prehistorians
Academics of Durham University
Academics of the University of Edinburgh
Alumni of Keble College, Oxford
People associated with the Ashmolean Museum